2010–11 Hong Kong Senior Challenge Shield, officially named as HKFA Canbo Senior Shield due to the competition's sponsorship by Guangdong Canbo Electrical, is the 109th season of one of the Asian oldest football knockout competitions, Hong Kong Senior Challenge Shield. It was a knockout competition for all the teams of Hong Kong First Division League. As winners, Citizen has guaranteed a place in the 2012 AFC Cup.

Calendar

Bracket

First round

Quarter-finals

Semi-finals

Final

Scorers
The scorers in the 2010–11 Hong Kong Senior Challenge Shield are as follows:

4 goals
 Paulinho Piracicaba (Citizen)

2 goals
 Cheng Lai Hin (South China)
 Sandro (Citizen)
 Ju Yingzhi (Citizen)

1 goal
 Bai He (South China)
 Lee Wai Lim (South China)
 Li Haiqiang (South China)
 Au Yeung Yiu Chung (South China)

 Alves (South China)
 Tales Schutz (South China)
 Giovane Alves da Silva (South China)
 Joel (South China)
 Festus Baise (Citizen)
 Tam Lok Hin (Citizen)
 Sham Kwok Keung (Citizen)
 Jordi Tarrés (Kitchee)
 Li Chun Yip (NT Realty Wofoo Tai Po)
 Christian Annan (NT Realty Wofoo Tai Po)
 Roberto Fronza (Fourway Rangers)

Prizes

External links
 Senior Shield - Hong Kong Football Association

2010-11
Shi
2010–11 domestic association football cups